Team Dukla Praha may refer to:

Team Dukla Praha (men's team), a professional cycling team that competes on the UCI Continental Tours
Team Dukla Praha (women's team), a professional cycling team that competes on the UCI Women's World Tour